Sam Kornhauser was the first coach of the Stony Brook Seawolves football program which represented Stony Brook University in the NCAA at the Division III, II, and I level. He was with the Seawolves from the first season in program history in 1984 (Division III) and successfully transitioned the Seawolves to Division I in the 1990s and early 2000s and joined the Northeast Conference offering scholarships in  the football program for the first time. While at Stony Brook he led the Seawolves to moderate success sharing a Northeast championship in 2005. He stepped down from his coaching duties at the end of the 2005 season and was replaced by Chuck Priore.

Record

Seasons

1984 season

1985 season

1986 season

1987 season

1988 season

1989 season

1990 season

1991 season

1992 season

1993 season

1994 season

1995 season

1996 season

1997 season

1998 season

1999 season

2000 season

2001 season

2002 season

2003 season

2004 season

2005 season

References

Stony Brook Seawolves football seasons